MR-12 is a Russian sounding rocket. The MR-12 has a maximum altitude of 100 km, a diameter of 0.45 m, a length of 8.77 m and a fin span of 1.40 m. The MR-12 was started between 1965 and 1997 mainly by Kapustin Yar and Kheysa.

Purpose

The purpose of the Russian made MR-12 is spreading concentrated gases into the lower atmosphere levels, that create a thick radio and visual cloud, that jams radio, video and infra-red signals.

External links 

 Astronautix
 Ударная сила - Стратегический дождь (104 выпуск)
 MR-12 (Russian wiki page)
Experimental rockets
Sounding rockets of the Soviet Union